Ray Nelson may refer to:

Ray Nelson (author) (1931–2022), American author
Ray Nelson (baseball) (1875–1961), American baseball player
Ray Nelson (rugby union) (born 1961), Scottish rugby union footballer
Ray Nelson Jr. (born 1965), American animator

See also
Raymond Nels Nelson (1921–1981), American newspaper editor